The list of ship decommissionings in 1958 includes a chronological list of all ships decommissioned in 1958.


See also 

1958
 Ship decommissionings
Ship